Sinotaia aeruginosa (synonym: Bellamya aeruginosa) is a species of freshwater snail with a gill and an operculum, an aquatic gastropod mollusk in the family Viviparidae. It is widely distributed and common species in China and in northern Vietnam inhabiting various shallow freshwater habitats, where it can reach high densities. It is a keystone species in its habitat and can significantly affect water quality and phytoplankton communities. It is commonly used in Chinese cuisine.

Taxonomy
This species was described under the name Paludina aeruginosa by English conchologist Lovell Augustus Reeve in 1863. He noted that it he thought it "very closely allied to Paludina quadrata". Reeve's original text (the type description) reads as follows:

The specific name aeruginosa derives from Latin aerūgō ("copper rust" or "bronze rust"), referring to the green color of the shell.

Later authors considered this taxon as a subspecies or form of Bellamya quadrata. It is generally classified as a species Sinotaia aeruginosa within the genus Sinotaia, although Chinese malacologists use the name Bellamya aeruginosa within the genus Bellamya.

Distribution
The species is found throughout China and Vietnam; indeed, S. aeruginosa is one of the most common species in China. It is common in the Yangtze River and Yellow River basins. The distribution of S. aeruginosa includes East China (Anhui, Fujian, Jiangsu, Jiangxi, Shandong, Shanghai, Zhejiang), Northeast China (Heilongjiang, Jilin, Liaoning), North China (Beijing, Hebei, Inner Mongolia, Shanxi, Tianjin), Northwest China (Ningxia, Shaanxi), Central China (Henan, Hubei, Hunan), Southwest China (Chongqing, Guizhou, Sichuan, Yunnan) and South China (Guangdong, Guangxi, Hainan). In Vietnam it is also common, but rarely reaches very high population densities. The type locality is "China". The species' distribution appears to have shrunk from the Middle Pleistocene to the Late Pleistocene, while a range expansion occurred in the Holocene.

Description
Adults snails have shell of greater height than width. The snail including the shell has a weight of about 2.8 g.

S. aeruginosa breathes with gills. The right tentacle is thickened in the male but not the female. The dry weight of composition of this species is as follows: 28.6% foot, 23.06% intestine, 9.78% gonad, 8.58% hepatopancreas, 29.98% other tissue. The diploid chromosome number of Sinotaia aeruginosa is 2n=16.

Ecology

Habitat
S. aeruginosa inhabits rice paddies, lakes, pools, slow flowing rivers, streams, ditches, ponds, and canals called khlongs in Vietnam. It has a benthic lifestyle and lives mainly in shallow littoral areas, usually in soft mud rich in organic matter. It can actively glide over the sediment or bury into it. This species is not actively migrating, rather its dispersal appears to be caused passively by floods, animals (zoochory), and accidentally by humans. The species prefers water temperatures typical of subtropical habitats, e.g.,  in Lake Tai.

Populations can reach densities of up to 400 snails/m2. In Chao Lake, it is the dominant gastropod species with an abundance 2-128 snails/m2 and an average biomass of 87.5 g/m2. It is similarly dominant in Lake Tai.

S. aeruginosa has been found to respond well to laboratory conditions with a water temperature of 24 °C, pH 8 and a 1:4 ratio of sediment to water.

Populations of S. aeruginosa at high densities are able to alter the physicochemical features of water. They decrease the concentration of chlorophyll a and thus directly increase water transparency. This indirectly decreases the concentration of dissolved oxygen through consumption of oxygen-producing algae. The species affects the composition of the phytoplankton community by decreasing the biomass of mostly toxic cyanobacteria and flagellates and promoting the biomass of mostly colonial green algae. Nitrogen concentrations may also be decreased. Its pronounced effect on water chemistry and community composition makes S. aeruginosa a keystone species in its habitat.

Feeding habits
S. aeruginosa is a herbivorous deposit feeder. It consumes mainly epiphytic algae, but its diet also includes detritus, bacteria, aquatic plants, sand grains, diatoms, green algae, and cyanobacteria such as Microcystis. Its consumption of cyanobacteria during algal blooms may result in bioaccumulation of toxic microcystins (microcystin-LR, microcystin-RR) from Microcystis in the gonads, the hepatopancreas and the digestive tract. Adult snails feeding ad libitum under ideal laboratory conditions eat 16.0 mg of fish food daily.

Life cycle
S. aeruginosa is gonochoristic, which means that each individual animal is distinctly male or female. The species is ovoviviparous. Newborn snails attach to non-sediment substrates (shells of adults or other material) in their first 2–3 days.

The shell length of juvenile snails starts at about 3 mm and grows rapidly by about 190 μm daily. Juveniles become adults at the age of nine weeks, when they reach a shell height of 12.15–16.09 mm; from then on, they grow more slowly at about 30 μm daily. Snails can be reliably sexed at this age.

Individuals start mating and reproducing in at water temperatures of 16–18 °C, although a temperature of 24–26 °C is optimal. Females start to give birth to the first newborn snails at the age of 18 weeks, when they reach a shell height of 15–16 mm and a body weight of 0.81–0.94 g. Gravidity of adult females lasts the entire year. The average number of newborn snails in the wild is 0.24 snails per day (50 per year) or up to 0.55 snails per day in the laboratory. Each gravid female carries 19–21 embryos inside her.

Generation time is quite short at about four months. The species can have three generations per year in the aquarium. The reproductive cycle is about six months.

Environmental sensitivity
S. aeruginosa has been the subject of various aquatic toxicology studies into the effects of copper, cadmium, lead, ethylbenzene, 2,2',4,4'- tetrabromodiphenyl ether, tributyltin, microcystin, multi-walled carbon nanotubes, and 17β-estradiol. The species has a high sensitivity to copper exposure and could thus be used for monitoring of sediment toxicity caused by environmental copper pollution.

Sinotaia aeruginosa snails from West Lake in Hanoi, Vietnam were found to be contaminated with copper, lead and zinc. The concentration of these elements in these snails exceeded standards of Food and Drug Administration and of Food Standards Australia New Zealand.

Distribution of rare-earth elements was studied in a labolatory. Results shown bioaccumulation of lanthanum, samarium, gadolinium and yttrium in Sinotaia aeruginosa and there was found no bioaccumulation of cerium in this snail.

Conservation
The species' population trend is unknown, but population sizes are mostly large. Water pollution and sedimentation are threats to local populations, while more general threats include habitat fragmentation by damming and habitat destruction. The genetic diversity of this species was found to be high in China. S. aeruginosa is currently classified as Least Concern by the IUCN.

Parasites and predators
S. aeruginosa serves as an intermediate host for Angiostrongylus cantonensis and for Echinochasmus fujianensis.

Predators of the species include the black carp Mylopharyngodon piceus; S. aeruginosa is one of the main food sources for this fish, making it important in the freshwater food chain.

Human use

S. aeruginosa is commonly sold in markets and restaurants in China and constitutes one of the three predominant freshwater snails found in Chinese markets, where it is considered a delicacy. The species is also used as feed in crab culture as well as fish, poultry and livestock raising. The annual production of S. aeruginosa in Chao Lake in 2002 amounted to 28 084 t. Although harvesting pressure in China is high, the high genetic diversity suggests that the species is currently not negatively affected by it.

References
This article incorporates public domain text from the reference

Further reading
 
 
 
  Yen T.-C. (1939). "Die chinesischen Land- und Süßwasser-Gastropoden des Natur-Museums Senckenberg". Senckenbergische Naturforschende Gesellschaft, Frankfurt, Germany.
 
 
  Zilch A. (1958). "Die Typen und Typoide des Natur-Museums Senckenberg, 21: Mollusca, Cyclophoridae, Craspedopominae-Cochlostominae". Archiv für Molluskenkunde 87: 53–76.

External links
 

Viviparidae